The Evangelical Lutheran Church in Kenya is a Lutheran denomination in Kenya. It is a member of the Global Confessional and Missional Lutheran Forum, the Lutheran World Federation (which it joined in 1970), the International Lutheran Council, and the National Council of Churches of Kenya. Its current archbishop is the Most Reverend Joseph Ochola Omolo.

History
The Evangelical Lutheran Church in Kenya (ELCK) was born out of the missionary work of the Swedish Lutheran Mission in 1948 under the name Swedish Lutheran Mission (SLM). In 1963, the name of the church was changed and registered as the Lutheran Church of Kenya (LCK). In 1973, the name was changed again to ELCK with three districts, namely North District, Kisii District, and Nyanza District.

In 1996, the church adopted episcopal polity, after the pattern of the Church of Sweden from which it had derived much early influence. The first bishop of the ELCK, Francis Nyamwaro, was elected that year. In 2002, the church was restructured into four dioceses (Central, Lake, South-West, and North-West). The first archbishop was elected and each diocese elected a diocesan bishop.

Structure

Archdiocese
Uhuru Highway Lutheran Church (Nairobi) was founded in 1964, with the present building consecrated in 1980. In 2005, it was elevated to the status of a cathedral by the archbishop of ELCK. Following the example of the Anglican Church of Kenya, the cathedral in Nairobi, together with its precincts, has now been separated into a distinct diocese, styled the Archdiocese of the ELCK, and named Uhuru Highway Cathedral Diocese. The cathedra of the archbishop is located here, with the archbishop heading the staff team of three ordained clergy and assorted lay ministers.

Dioceses
The ELCK is administered from Nairobi, with the cathedral of the archbishop on Uhuru Highway, and the administrative office on University Way. The church consists of six dioceses:
 Uhuru Highway Cathedral Diocese
 South West Diocese
 Lake Diocese
 Central Diocese
 North West Diocese
 Nyamira Diocese

Doctrine
The ELCK is a mainstream Lutheran denomination, with doctrines centred upon the Christian scriptures of the Old and New Testaments as the inspired word of God, the catholic creeds (the Apostles' Creed, the Nicene Creed, and the Athanasian Creed), and the text of the Lutheran Augsburg Confession of 1530 together with Martin Luther's Large and Small Catechisms. The ELCK holds to mainstream Lutheran doctrines of the forgiveness of sins in baptism, and the real presence of Christ in the Eucharist.

Mission and objectives
ELCK exists to proclaim the gospel of Jesus Christ through the proper administration of the sacraments, providing the confessional Lutheran teachings, and caring for the well being of the whole person. The vision of this Church is to proclaim the good news of the crucified and resurrected Christ, the only way to salvation.

See also
List of Lutheran dioceses and archdioceses

References

External links 
 
Lutheran World Federation listing
International Lutheran Council listing

1964 establishments in Kenya
International Lutheran Council members
Lutheran denominations established in the 20th century
Lutheran World Federation members
Global Confessional and Missional Lutheran Forum members
Lutheranism in Kenya
Christian organizations established in 1964